The Jordanian Eastern Command (Arabic:المنطقة العسكرية الشرقية) is the Jordanian Armed Forces regional command responsible for the North - East front against Syria and Iraq.

History 
Since major restructuring in 1977, the Royal Jordanian Army has kept the Eastern Command (formerly known as 5th Armoured Division) deployed between the Iraqi border and Ar Ramtha on the Syrian border with some presence in Zarqa. But in 2000, King Abdullah II made a big step to modernize and restructure Jordanian Armed Forces when the Divisions have been transformed into a lighter, more mobile forces, based largely on a brigade structure and considered better capable of rapid reaction in emergencies.

Jordanian forces traditionally maintained a defensive posture along this sector. A number of major roads link Jordan and Syria in this region, crossing undulating terrain with no natural obstacles. The important air base at Mafraq are less than 20 km from the border with Syria and are therefore vulnerable to surprise attack or artillery bombardment. As a result, Jordanian forces traditionally paid particular attention to their defenses in this region. The Sector from Ramtha to the Iraqi border was covered by the Eastern Command (5th Armoured Division).

This command was involved in many conflicts and engagements, including the Six-Day War, the War of Attrition (and its Battle of Karameh) and war against the Syrian army during Black September.

Organisation 
The Eastern Command controls regional units from Ar Ramtha and Mafraq to the Iraqi border with some units based in Zarqa. The Head of Eastern command is Brigadier General Mohammed Suleiman Bani Yasin.

Eastern Command HQ 

 Command Staff
 HQ Defense Company
 Command Communication Group
 Command Military Police

Border Guard Force (BGF) 

 1st Border Guard Force Brigade
 Brigade HQ
 Command Staff
 Signal Company 
 Medical Center
 Vehicles & Weapons Maintenance Workshop
 Reconnaissance & Surveillance Center 
 1st Border Guard Force Battalion
 4th Border Guard Force Battalion
 5th Border Guard Force Battalion
 6th Border Guard Force Battalion

Combat & Maneuver Units 

 Martyr Wasfi Al-Tal 2nd Mechanized Infantry Brigade
 Brigade HQ
 Command Staff
 Joint Fires Coordination Cell - Targeting Cell
 Signal Company
 Medical Center 
 Vehicles & Weapons Maintenance Workshop
 Chemical Support Platoon (Attached)
 JTAC Team
 Habis Al-Majali 4th Mechanized Infantry Battalion (YPR-765 pri)
 Royal Guard 6th Mechanized Infantry Battalion (M113A2 MK1)
 Prince Faisal 17th Tank Battalion (M60A3)
 1st Field Artillery Battalion (M109A3)
 81st Field Air Defense Battalion (Shilka,Strela-10,Igla)
 Anti-Armor Company (Kornet-E)

 Martyr King Abdullah I 90th Mechanized Infantry Brigade
 Brigade HQ
 Command Staff
 Joint Fires Coordination Cell - Targeting Cell
 Signal Company
 Medical Center 
 Vehicles & Weapons Maintenance Workshop
 Chemical Support Platoon (Attached)
 JTAC Team
 Al-Hussien 2nd Mechanized Infantry Battalion (YPR-765 pri)
 Princess Basma 3rd Mechanized Infantry Battalion (M113A2 MK1)
 Prince Talal 5th Mechanized Infantry Battalion (YPR-765 pri)
 12th Field Artillery Battalion (M109A3)
 5th Field Air Defense Battalion (Shilka,Strela-10,Igla) 
 Anti-Armor Company (M901 ITV)

Combat Support Units 

 Eastern Command Artillery [1]
 Command Artillery HQ
 STA Company
 41st Mortar Battalion (AGRAB Mk2)
 5th Field Air Defense Group [1]
 Group HQ
 Signal Company
 Command Engineer Battalion 
 3 Mechanized Engineer Companies [2]
 General Support Company

Service Support Units 
 Supply and Transport Battalion
 3 Supply & Transport Companies [2]
 Command Maintenance Group
 Medical Support Group
 Administrative Transport Group

Command Training Center 
Notes:
  Subordinate battalions attached to combat brigades
  Each company supports a brigade

Unit summary

References 

Military units and formations of Jordan
Military units and formations established in 2000